Gianni Vernetti (born 27 November 1960) is a writer and Italian politician.

Early life
Gianni Vernetti was born in Torino, Italy. In 1985 he graduated in Architecture at the Polytechnic University of Turin. In 1987 he was awarded a PhD in Urban Ecology from the Polytechnic University of Milan.

Career
Between 1993 and 1999, Vernetti was Deputy Mayor of Turin, in charge of Public Works, Environment and Sustainable Development, and Urban Renovation.

In 2001, he was elected to the Chamber of Deputies of the Italian Parliament. As leader of his Group in the Commission on Energy and Industry he promoted several initiatives on Renewable Energies.
He was member of the National Steering Committee of his party, The Daisy, a center-left political party member of the European Democratic Party (EDP) and of the Alliance of Liberals and Democrats for Europe Group (ALDE) in the European Parliament.

In 2006, he was elected to the Senate of the Republic, and after the center-left coalition won the general election he became Undersecretary of State for Foreign Affairs in the Prodi government. He was in charge of bilateral relations between Italy and the Asia/Pacific countries and on Democracy and Human Rights issues. Vernetti coordinated all the Italian initiatives in Afghanistan, where Italy takes part in the NATO military mission and is coordinating the Justice Sector and Rule of Law Reform.

He promoted the new Italian policies towards Central Asia implementing several development aid projects, and improving economic, commercial and  military cooperation. He coordinated the Italian initiatives in Asia promoting several projects of economic, scientific, commercial and military cooperation, particularly between Italy and India, China, South Korea, Sri Lanka, Indonesia, and Pakistan.

Vernetti coordinated the Italian campaign for the Universal Moratorium on the Death Penalty, coordinating the action to seek consensus at the United Nations that led to the approval of the resolution in December 2007. He represented as well Italy in the UN Human Rights Council between 2006 and 2008.
Vernetti coordinated the Italian initiatives in the Pacific area and promoted the entrance of Italy into the Pacific Islands Forum.

In 2008, Vernetti was elected for a third term in the Chamber of Deputies and he was a member of the Foreign Affairs Committee and the Italian Delegation to the NATO Parliamentarian Assembly. He was member of the Steering Committee of the European Democratic Party.

He is Coordinator of the Alliance of Democrats an international network of more than 70 democratic, liberal and centrist political parties from all the five continents.

He is co-president of the Italian Group of the Liberal International.

He became President of the Italy-Tibet Parliamentary Association in 2008, and Vice-President of the Italy-Israel Parliamentary Association.

In 2013, after three terms in Parliament, he decided to not run again and founded Gea Solar, a company focused on utility scale Solar PV development in Africa, Asia and Latin America.

Since January 2018, he is columnist on foreign affairs at the Italian daily newspaper La Stampa and in May 2020 became columnist at La Repubblica and Huffington Post, writing several op-ed and reportage on foreign politics, security and human rights.

Personal life
He is married to Laura De Donato, a journalist. They have four children.

References

External links
 Personal website
  Camera dei Deputati
  Senato della Repubblica

1960 births
Living people
Politicians from Turin
Democracy is Freedom – The Daisy politicians
Polytechnic University of Turin alumni
Polytechnic University of Milan alumni
Deputies of Legislature XIV of Italy
Deputies of Legislature XVI of Italy
Senators of Legislature XV of Italy